Piney Park or Piney Bluff Park is a community in Franklin County in the U.S. state of Missouri. The community is on Missouri Route K approximately four miles southeast of Saint Clair.

The site was established as a resort area on a bluff above the Meramec River.

References

Unincorporated communities in Franklin County, Missouri
Unincorporated communities in Missouri